The Tell-Tale Message is a 1912 American short silent film drama.

Cast
Earle Foxe
Hazel Neason
Stuart Holmes
Lawrence Wood

External links

1912 films
American silent short films
1912 drama films
American black-and-white films
Kalem Company films
1912 short films
Silent American drama films
1910s American films